Lauterbach GmbH is a German electronic design automation firm specializing in in-circuit emulators and logic analyzers used for debugging embedded systems. The firm was founded in 1979 by Lothar Lauterbach. In 2009 the firm was renamed from Lauterbach Datentechnik GmbH to Lauterbach GmbH.

The company serves a niche-market of in-circuit emulators, especially on systems using JTAG, which it sells under the brand name TRACE32. It is the global market leader in the area of hardware assisted debug tools for embedded systems, with over 80000 development seats sold. They have delivered 65000 debug licenses for the popular ARM microprocessor alone, and they support all available ARM cores. 

Lauterbach has participated in the following international committees over the past years: Nexus (standard), MIPI Debug Working Group, SPRINT Forum and Power.org.

Lauterbach has local subsidiaries in United Kingdom, United States, Japan, France, Italy, China and Tunisia. The company is privately held by the founding family, with the two brothers Lothar and Stephan Lauterbach as its directors. Dr. Thomas Ullmann was appointed as additional managing director in March 2020.

In 2017, Lauterbach was selected as a development partner by SiFive to develop the first comprehensive RISC-V debugging toolset, adding support for the RISC-V debug specification to TRACE32.

References

External links
 

Electronic design automation companies
Companies based in Bavaria
Electronics companies of Germany